Hans Zesch-Ballot (20 May 1896 – 1 September 1972) was a German film actor.

Selected filmography
 Dolly Gets Ahead (1930)
 The Magic Top Hat (1932)
 Spoiling the Game (1932)
 And the Plains Are Gleaming (1933)
 Holiday From Myself (1934)
 Love and the First Railway (1934)
 The Girlfriend of a Big Man (1934)
 Police Report (1934)
 The Bird Seller (1935)
 My Life for Maria Isabella (1935)
 The Traitor (1936)
 Winter in the Woods (1936)
 Der Kaiser von Kalifornien (1936)
 Ninety Minute Stopover (1936)
 The Czar's Courier (1936)
 The Night With the Emperor (1936)
 Talking About Jacqueline (1937)
 Tango Notturno (1937)
 The Impossible Mister Pitt (1938)
 The Night of Decision (1938)
 The Tiger of Eschnapur (1938)
 Three Wonderful Days (1939)
 Central Rio (1939)
 Police Report (1939)
 Woman Without a Past (1939)
 Happiness Is the Main Thing (1941)
 Riding for Germany (1941)
 Attack on Baku (1942)
 When the Young Wine Blossoms (1943)
 The Buchholz Family (1944)
 Marriage of Affection (1944)
 Gaspary's Sons (1948)
 Search for Majora (1949)
 The Rabanser Case (1950)
 Third from the Right (1950)
 Wedding with Erika (1950)
 Nights on the Road (1952)
 Elephant Fury (1953)
 Love's Carnival (1955)
 The Girl from the Marsh Croft (1958)
 Doctor Crippen Lives (1958)

References

Bibliography
 Goble, Alan. The Complete Index to Literary Sources in Film. Walter de Gruyter, 1999.

External links

1896 births
1972 deaths
Actors from Dresden
German male film actors
20th-century German male actors